Maria Reyes (Mexico, 2002) is a queer ecofeminist climate and human rights activist from Puebla. She is currently a full-time activist at Fridays for Future MAPA and Fridays for Future International. Her activism focuses on communicating the message of the climate emergency in an intersectional way. She also collaborates in scientific empowerment initiatives with the US-Mexico Leaders Network foundation.

References 

Mexican activists
21st-century Mexican people
People from Puebla
Climate activists
Year of birth missing (living people)
Living people